Quartet/Quintet/Sextet is an album by jazz saxophonist Lou Donaldson featuring his earliest recordings as a leader on the Blue Note label performed by Donaldson's Quartet with pianist Horace Silver, bassist  Gene Ramey and drummer Art Taylor, his Quintet with Silver, trumpeter Blue Mitchell, drummer  Art Blakey and bassist Percy Heath, and a Sextet with Heath, Blakey, trumpeter Kenny Dorham, trombonist Matthew Gee and pianist Elmo Hope. The album was originally released as a 10" LP, then as a 12" long-playing record, and finally as a CD with additional tracks added.

Review
The AllMusic review by Stephen Thomas Erlewine stated: "While Donaldson's tone isn't quite as full as it would be within just five years, he impresses with his bold, speedy technique and fine phrasing. He doesn't play anything out of the ordinary, but he plays it very, very well, and his playing is enhanced by the three stellar bands that support him on these sessions... Everyone plays in a straight bop and hard bop tradition, contributing fine performances to a strong debut effort by Donaldson".

Track listing
All compositions by Lou Donaldson, except where noted.
 "Lou's Blues"
 "Cheek to Cheek" (Irving Berlin)
 "Roccus" (Horace Silver)
 "If I Love Again" (Ben Oakland)
 "Down Home"
 "The Best Things in Life Are Free" (Lew Brown, Buddy DeSylva, Ray Henderson)
 "Sweet Juice" (Silver)
 "Caracas"
 "Moe's Bluff"
Recorded at WOR Studios, NYC, June 20, 1952 (tracks 1-3) and November 19, 1952 (tracks 4-7) and Van Gelder Studio, Hackensack, NJ, August 22, 1954 (tracks 8 & 9).

Personnel

Musicians
Lou Donaldson – alto saxophone
Horace Silver – piano (tracks 1-7)
Elmo Hope – piano (tracks 8 & 9)
Blue Mitchell – trumpet (tracks 5-7)
Kenny Dorham – trumpet (tracks 8 & 9)
Matthew Gee – trombone (tracks 8 & 9)
Gene Ramey – bass (tracks 1-3)
Percy Heath – bass (tracks 4-9)
Art Taylor – drums (tracks 1-3)
Art Blakey – drums (tracks 4-9)

Production
 Alfred Lion – producer
 Reid Miles – design
 Rudy Van Gelder – engineer
 Francis Wolff – photography

References

Lou Donaldson albums
Horace Silver albums
Blue Note Records albums
Albums produced by Alfred Lion